The 1937 Phillip Island Trophy was a motor race held at the then-new 3.3 mile Phillip Island "triangular" circuit, in Victoria, Australia on 15 March 1937. It was contested over 45 laps, a distance of 150 miles. Organised by the Victorian Sporting Car Club, it was staged on a handicap basis with the limit starter commencing the race 30 minutes before the scratch starter.

The race was won by Bob Lea-Wright driving a Terraplane Special. Lea-Wright also set the fastest race time.

Results

Notes
 Race distance: 45 laps, 150 miles 
 Format: Handicap start (Limit starter commenced 30 minutes before scratch starter) 
 Limit starter: H.R Syme (MG J3) (Syme was to start his supercharged MG off 21 minutes but pre-race mechanical problems resulted in him starting, without the supercharger fitted, from a revised handicap of 30 minutes.)
 Scratch starter: Lyster Jackson (MG K3) 
 Starters: 19
 Fastest Time: R.A. Lea-Wright (Terraplane) 
 Average speed of winning car: Approximately 66 mph

Race name
Some sources refer to the race as the Philip Island Trophy, whilst others use various names including Victorian Sporting Car Club's 150 miles race.

Notes & References

External links
 Lea Wright Wins 150-Miles Road Race, The Advertiser, Tuesday 16 March 1937, page 14, as archived at trove.nla.gov.au

Phillip Island Trophy
Motorsport at Phillip Island